Menchaca  is a corregimiento in Ocú District, Herrera Province, Panama with a population of 1,517 as of 2010. It was created by Law 41 of April 30, 2003.

See also
Carlos Menchaca (born 1980), American politician

References

Corregimientos of Herrera Province